Jimara may refer to:
 Mount Dzhimara, a mount in Russia and Georgia.
 Djimara, a village in the historical region of Khevi, north-eastern Georgia.
 Jimara (genus), an insect genus in the tribe Dikraneurini